David Adams and Andrei Olhovskiy were the defending champions, but did not participate this year.

Cristian Brandi and Federico Mordegan won in the final, via walkover, against Richard Krajicek and Menno Oosting.

Seeds

  Sergio Casal /  Emilio Sánchez (first round)
  Hendrik Jan Davids /  Piet Norval (first round)
  David Prinosil /  Udo Riglewski (first round)
  Shelby Cannon /  Scott Melville (quarterfinals)

Draw

Draw

External links
Draw

Doubles